Traskorchestia is a genus of beach hoppers in the family Talitridae. There are at least three described species in Traskorchestia.

Species
These three species belong to the genus Traskorchestia:
 Traskorchestia georgiana (Bousfield, 1958)
 Traskorchestia ochotensis (Brandt, 1851)
 Traskorchestia traskiana (Stimpson, 1857) (Pacific beach hopper)

References

Further reading

 
 

Amphipoda
Articles created by Qbugbot